Waldo Stakes (born 23 November 1955) is an American general contractor and designer of high speed vehicles. Stakes is planning to break the world land speed record using a rocket car powered by a second-hand X-15 rocket engine, which he has named the Sonic Wind Land Speed Research Vehicle.

Stakes was a founder and one-time curator of the Saxon Aerospace Museum in Boron, California.

Stakes was a collaborator with "Mad" Mike Hughes in his attempts to achieve suborbital flight using a steam-driven rocket.

References

External links
 Sonic Wind Official Page
 Imagine LSRV Official Page

Land speed record people
1955 births
Living people